The Z-13 was an electric heavy torpedo of the French Navy based on captured German technology.

It was designed to be fired from submerged submarines to target surface ships. The Z-13 was propelled by two electric motors, each driving a propeller. A Ni-Cd battery fed the engines.

The payload could be detonated either on contact, or by a magnetic detonator.

References

Torpedoes
Naval weapons of France